The  sciatic nerve, also called the ischiadic nerve, is a large nerve in humans and other vertebrate animals which is the largest branch of the sacral plexus and runs alongside the hip joint and down the lower limb. It is the longest and widest single nerve in the human body, going from the top of the leg to the foot on the posterior aspect. The sciatic nerve has no cutaneous branches for the thigh. This nerve provides the connection to the nervous system for the skin of the lateral leg and the whole foot, the muscles of the back of the thigh, and those of the leg and foot. It is derived from spinal nerves L4 to S3. It contains fibers from both the anterior and posterior divisions of the lumbosacral plexus.

Structure
In humans, the sciatic nerve is formed from the L4 to S3 segments of the sacral plexus, a collection of nerve fibres that emerge from the sacral part of the spinal cord. The lumbosacral trunk from the L4 and L5 roots descends between the sacral promontory and ala and the S1 to S3 roots emerge from the ventral sacral foramina. These nerve roots unite to form a single nerve in front of the piriformis muscle. The nerve passes beneath piriformis and through the greater sciatic foramen, exiting the pelvis. From here, it travels down the posterior thigh to the popliteal fossa. The nerve travels in the posterior compartment of the thigh behind (superficial to) the adductor magnus muscle, and is itself in front of (deep to) the long head of the biceps femoris muscle. At the popliteal fossa, the nerve divides into its two branches:
 The tibial nerve, which travels down the posterior compartment of the leg into the foot
 The common fibular nerve (also called the common peroneal nerve), which travels down the anterior and lateral compartments of the leg into the foot

The sciatic nerve is the largest nerve in the human body.

Development

Function
The sciatic nerve supplies sensation to the skin of the foot, as well as the entire lower leg (except for its inner side). Sensation to skin to the sole of the foot is provided by the tibial nerve, and the lower leg and upper surface of the foot via the common fibular nerve.

The sciatic nerve also innervates muscles. In particular: 
 Via the tibial nerve, the muscles in the posterior compartment of the leg and sole of the foot (plantar aspect). 
 Via the common fibular nerve, the muscles in the anterior and lateral compartments of the leg.

Clinical significance

Sciatica

Pain caused by a compression or irritation of the sciatic nerve by a problem in the lower back is called sciatica.  Common causes of sciatica include the following lower back and hip conditions:  spinal disc herniation, degenerative disc disease, lumbar spinal stenosis, spondylolisthesis, and piriformis syndrome.  Other acute causes of sciatica include coughing, muscular hypertension, and sneezing.

Injury
Sciatic nerve injury occurs between 0.5% and 2.0% of the time during a hip replacement.  Sciatic nerve palsy is a complication of total hip arthroplasty with an incidence of 0.2% to 2.8% of the time, or with an incidence of 1.7% to 7.6% following revision. Following the procedure, in rare cases, a screw, broken piece of trochanteric wire, fragment of methyl methacrylate bone cement, or of a Burch-Schneider antiprofusio cage can impinge on the nerve; this can cause sciatic nerve palsy which may resolve after the fragment is removed and the nerve freed.  The nerve can be surrounded in oxidized regenerated cellulose to prevent further scarring.  Sciatic nerve palsy can also result from severe spinal stenosis following the procedure, which can be addressed by spinal decompression surgery. It is unclear if inversion therapy is able to decompress the sacral vertebrae; it may only work on the lumbar aspects of the sciatic nerves.
 
Sciatic nerve injury may also occur from improperly performed injections into the buttock, and may result in sensory loss.

Other disease
Bernese periacetabular osteotomy resulted in major nerve deficits in the sciatic or femoral nerves in 2.1% of 1760 patients, of whom approximately half experienced complete recovery within a mean of 5.5 months.

Sciatic nerve exploration can be done by endoscopy in a minimally invasive procedure to assess lesions of the nerve.  Endoscopic treatment for sciatic nerve entrapment has been investigated in deep gluteal syndrome. Patients were treated with sciatic nerve decompression by resection of fibrovascular scar bands, piriformis tendon release, obturator internus, or quadratus femoris or by hamstring tendon scarring.

Anesthetic
Signals from the sciatic nerve and its branches can be blocked, in order to interrupt transmission of pain signal from the innervation area, by performing a regional nerve blockade called a sciatic nerve block.

Society and culture
According to Jewish law, the sciatic nerve (Hebrew: Gid hanasheh) may not be eaten by Jews, to commemorate Jacob's  injury in his struggle with an angel.

Additional images

See also

 Lesser sciatic notch
 Greater sciatic notch

Notes

References

External links
 
 
 
 
 Sciatica and the Sciatic Nerve

Nerves of the lower limb and lower torso